The Greenwood Cemetery (est. 1937) is a historic cemetery in Tallahassee, Florida. It is an African-American or "colored" cemetery located on Old Bainbridge Road, which was originally the main route out of Tallahassee to the northwest. On June 5, 2003, it was added to the U.S. National Register of Historic Places. Professional football player Willie Galimore (1935–1964) is buried there.

References

External links

 Leon County listings at National Register of Historic Places
 Leon County listings at Florida's Office of Cultural and Historical Programs
 

National Register of Historic Places in Tallahassee, Florida
Geography of Tallahassee, Florida
History of Tallahassee, Florida
Protected areas of Leon County, Florida
Cemeteries in Florida
African-American cemeteries in Florida
African-American history of Florida
1937 establishments in Florida
Cemeteries established in the 1930s